Adam Robert Oates (born August 27, 1962) is a Canadian former professional ice hockey player, former co-head coach for the New Jersey Devils and former head coach for the Washington Capitals. He played 19 seasons in the National Hockey League (NHL) for the Detroit Red Wings, St. Louis Blues, Boston Bruins, Washington Capitals, Philadelphia Flyers, Mighty Ducks of Anaheim and Edmonton Oilers. Known as an elite playmaker, Oates' career total of 1,079 assists was the fifth-highest total in NHL history at the time of his 2004 retirement. He has the highest amount of games played and points scored among undrafted NHL players with 1337 and 1420 respectively.

After retiring as a player, Oates served as an assistant coach for the Tampa Bay Lightning and New Jersey Devils prior to joining the Capitals as their head coach for two seasons, from 2012 to 2014. In 2017, Oates was named one of the 100 Greatest NHL Players in history.

As a college player, Oates was a standout forward for the RPI Engineers. He set single-season school records for assists and points and was named an Eastern College Athletic Conference (ECAC) all-star and National Collegiate Athletic Association (NCAA) All-American in both 1984 and 1985. Oates was named a tournament all-star in helping RPI win the 1985 national championship, and in 1990–91, the NHL included him in its second All-Star team; he played in five All-Star Games. He holds the record for most points all-time of any NHL player who also played NCAA Hockey. Oates was inducted into the Hockey Hall of Fame on November 12, 2012.

Early life
Oates was born on August 27, 1962 in Weston, a neighborhood in Toronto. As a youth, he played both hockey and box lacrosse, favouring the latter sport. He played in the 1975 Quebec International Pee-Wee Hockey Tournament with a minor ice hockey team from Toronto.

Oates played five seasons with the Etobicoke Eclipse of the Ontario Lacrosse Association (OLA) Junior A Lacrosse League. An offensive standout, Oates' total of 181 points in 19 games in 1981 was the 11th highest total in OLA junior history at the time. As the league's leading scorer, he won the Bobby Allan Award and in one game that season, set OLA Junior A single-game records of 19 assists and 29 points. Oates played one season of Senior A with the Brampton Excelsiors of Major Series Lacrosse but left the game in 1984 to focus on his hockey career.

Describing his younger self as a "punk", Oates said he partied frequently. He dropped out of high school to focus on hockey and ended up working as a gas station attendant at age 19. Oates played two full seasons and parts of a third with the Junior A Markham Waxers of the Ontario Provincial Junior A Hockey League (OPJAHL). He scored 89 points in 43 games during 1980–81, and 159 points – including 105 assists – in 1981–82. He went unselected in the NHL Entry Draft, however, as scouts considered him too slow to play in the NHL. He returned to high school to complete his diploma when he was recruited to play for Rensselaer Polytechnic Institute (RPI).

Playing career

College
RPI's assistant coach Paul Allen noticed Oates during a 1982 OPJAHL game while scouting a different player and offered him a position on the school's team. Consequently, Oates played three seasons with the RPI Engineers, leading the team in assists each year. After scoring 42 points in 22 games in his freshman season of 1982–83, he spent the summer working with a skating instructor to improve his foot speed. In 1983–84, he set school records in points with 83 and assists with 57. He was named to the East Coast Athletic Conference (ECAC) second all-star team and became the first RPI hockey player to earn a berth on the National Collegiate Athletic Association (NCAA) All-American team since 1965.

In 1984–85, Oates broke his own school records by recording 60 assists and 91 points. His career total of 150 assists remains a school record . Again named an NCAA All-American, he was voted to the ECAC first all-star team, and was a finalist for the Hobey Baker Award as the top hockey player in the NCAA. After helping RPI win the 1985 national championship, he was included in the all-tournament team. In his three years with RPI, the Engineers recorded an  record and won the ECAC championships in 1984 and 1985. Oates was voted to the ECAC's all-decade team of the 1980s. He was inducted into RPI's Athletics Hall of Fame, and was named the inaugural member of the hockey team's Ring of Honor in 2004.

Detroit and St. Louis
NHL teams took interest in Oates following his junior season; at least five teams attempted to sign him. Choosing to forgo his final year of college eligibility, Oates signed a four-year, $1.1 million contract with the Detroit Red Wings that made him the highest paid rookie in the NHL in 1985–86. He made his NHL debut on October 10, 1985, against the Minnesota North Stars, scoring his first goal that night on goaltender Don Beaupre and added an assist. After this, Oates struggled offensively and was pointless in his following 16 games; the team subsequently demoted him to the Adirondack Red Wings of the American Hockey League (AHL). Oates split the remainder of the season between Detroit and Adirondack, finishing his first NHL season with 38 games played, 9 goals and 11 assists. In the AHL, he scored 18 goals and 28 assists in 34 games. Having finished the NHL season in Detroit, he was returned to Adirondack for the AHL playoffs which the team won to take the Calder Cup championship.

Oates established himself as a full-time NHLer in 1986–87, scoring 47 points in 76 games. He improved to 54 points in 63 games the following year despite missing a month due to a groin injury, and finished third in team scoring with 78 points in 1988–89. However, Detroit made changes following a first round loss in the playoffs; Oates, along with Paul MacLean, was traded to the St. Louis Blues on June 15, 1989, in exchange for veterans Bernie Federko and Tony McKegney. The deal, which is now considered one of the worst in Red Wings' history, left Oates "heartbroken" to leave his first NHL club.

The Blues made Oates their first-line centre and played him alongside Brett Hull.  The pair, dubbed "Hull and Oates" as a play on the band Hall and Oates, put up prolific offensive numbers. In 1989–90, Oates topped the 100-point mark for the first time in his career with 102 points. He improved to 115 in 1990–91. He helped Hull score 72 and 86 goals those seasons, the latter the third highest in single-season total in NHL history. Oates was named to the second all-star team following the season and played in the 1991 All-Star Game.

Oates signed a four-year, $3 million contract extension with the Blues prior to the 1991–92 season, but after the team signed Brendan Shanahan, Garth Butcher and Ron Sutter to significant deals, felt he was underpaid. After playing in his second career All-Star Game, he threatened to walk off the team following the All-Star break if the Blues did not renegotiate his contract, prompting a negative reaction from St. Louis fans, who booed him loudly. The conflict was resolved on February 7, 1992, when the team traded him to the Boston Bruins in exchange for Craig Janney and Stéphane Quintal.

Boston and Washington
Oates' best individual season came in his first full year in Boston. He led the league with 97 assists in 1992–93 and finished third in overall scoring with 142 points. At the 1993 All-Star Game, Oates set a record by recording four assists in one period as part of a 16–6 victory for the Wales Conference. He played in his fourth consecutive All-Star Game in 1994 and again finished third in league scoring with 112 points in 1993–94. In a five-year period between 1989 and 1994, Oates was the second-highest point producer in the NHL. His average of 114 points per season over that time was second to Wayne Gretzky's 124.

A finger injury suffered during the 1994 Stanley Cup playoffs hampered Oates throughout the 1994–95 season and required surgery at the season's conclusion. Despite the injury, Oates finished fourth in the NHL with 41 assists in a season disrupted by a work stoppage. In game five of the conference quarter-final series against the New Jersey Devils, Oates scored the final goal in the history of the Boston Garden in a 4–1 loss. The Bruins signed him to a five-year, $10 million contract extension late in that season, but Oates once again became frustrated with his salary relative to the rest of the league by 1997. With the Bruins struggling on the ice and out of playoff contention late in 1996–97 season, Oates publicly berated team management, saying, "You go on a [road] trip and everyone says it's a big trip. For what? So we can win five games because we're lousy and we get in the eighth spot and lose four straight and get embarrassed and then get shelled all summer? It's upstairs, baby. That's their job, not ours. ... Are we rebuilding? What are we doing? What direction are we going in?"

Less than two weeks after his tirade, on March 1, 1997, Oates was traded to the Washington Capitals. In the trade, Oates, Bill Ranford and Rick Tocchet went to Washington in exchange for Jim Carey, Anson Carter, Jason Allison and a draft pick. Oates initially refused to report to Washington, demanding his contract be renegotiated, but chose to join the team after a four-day holdout. He continued to demand a new contract in the off-season, while his agent claimed Oates would retire before playing for the Capitals again. After several months of contentious negotiations, the two sides agreed to a three-year contract worth around $2.9 million per season with an option on a fourth year.

Oates became the 47th player in NHL history, and the 15th fastest, to score his 1,000th career point on October 7, 1997, against the New York Islanders. He reached the milestone by scoring a hat-trick and adding two assists for the sixth five-point game of his career. He finished the 1997–98 season as the team leader with 56 assists, and second to Peter Bondra in team scoring with 78 points. The Capitals reached the 1998 Stanley Cup Finals, which they lost to the Detroit Red Wings in a four game sweep; their first finals appearance in franchise history.

The Capitals named Oates the ninth captain in franchise history prior to the 1999–2000 season, following the departure of his predecessor, Dale Hunter. He led the team in scoring with 71 points and played his 1,000th NHL game on December 22, 1999, against the Vancouver Canucks. He led the league in assists the following two seasons, at the ages of 38 and 39, with 69 in 2000–01 and 64 in 2001–02. On January 14, 2002, Oates became the eighth player in NHL history to reach 1,000 career assists when he set up Dainus Zubrus' overtime winning goal in a 1–0 victory over the Boston Bruins.

Philadelphia, Anaheim and Edmonton
With Washington out of playoff contention late in the 2001–02 season and with his contract expiring following the season, the Capitals traded Oates to the Philadelphia Flyers on March 19, 2002, in exchange for goaltender Maxime Ouellet and the Flyers' first, second and third round selections in the 2002 NHL Entry Draft. The Flyers hoped that bringing Oates in would solidify their playoff chances. The move did not work, as the Flyers were defeated in the first round by the lower ranked Ottawa Senators, losing the series in five games. The team scored only one goal in regulation time and were shut-out three times by Ottawa's Patrick Lalime.

The Flyers chose not to offer Oates a new contract following the loss, making him an unrestricted free agent. He then signed a $3.5 million contract for the 2002–03 season, with an option for 2003–04, with the Mighty Ducks of Anaheim on July 1, 2002. He scored 45 points in 67 games with the Mighty Ducks, and added 13 points in 21 playoff games. Anaheim reached the 2003 Stanley Cup Finals, where in the third game of the series against the New Jersey Devils, Oates assisted on Ruslan Salei's overtime-winning goal. It was Oates' ninth career playoff overtime point, tying him with Joe Sakic and Doug Gilmour for the NHL all-time lead. The Ducks ultimately lost the series in seven games.

The Mighty Ducks declined their option on the 41-year-old Oates' contract, again making him a free agent. He remained unsigned six weeks into the 2003–04 season, until he agreed to a one-year contract with the Edmonton Oilers on November 17, 2003. He appeared in 60 games in Edmonton, scoring 2 goals and 16 assists. The Oilers were eliminated from playoff contention in their final game of the season with a 5–2 loss to the Vancouver Canucks on April 4, 2004. Oates announced his retirement as a player immediately after the game.

Playing style

Oates was one of the NHL's great playmakers, a style that he credits his father as encouraging: "It was just kind of our family talks: 'If you can be unselfish, your teammates will always like you.' And it just kind of became my role, where I was obviously trying to please my dad, growing up and becoming a playmaker out of that." Oates' father, a British immigrant, idolized Stanley Matthews, considered one of the greatest association football (soccer) players of all-time and hoped that his son would adopt a pass-first mentality similar to Matthews.

Oates led the NHL in assists three times – 1992–93, 2000–01 and 2001–02 – and finished in the top ten on 12 occasions. Oates finished third in league scoring three times; 1990-91, 1992-93, and 1993-94. He is also the only player in NHL history to centre three 50-goal scorers, helping Brett Hull, Cam Neely and Peter Bondra reach the mark.  His teammates praised his consistency, noting Oates continued to score points at an elite level when he did not have star players as linemates. Oates was able to score himself, reaching the 20 goal mark seven times, including a career high 45 in 1992–93, a season in which he led the league with 11 game-winning goals. Boston teammate Ray Bourque suggested in 1994 that Oates was underrated, saying, "I think a lot of people take what he does for granted. He does it in a quiet way. He's not a flashy guy. He's not looking for attention, he just goes out and does it. He's the best centerman I've been around. I never knew he was this good playing against him because I didn't see him this much." Others have concurred, noted that Oates never received the attention nor honors of the other nine players on the NHL's top ten all-time assists list.

At the time of Oates' retirement, his 1,420 points was the 13th highest total in NHL history, and his 1,079 assists ranked 5th. He played in a total of five NHL All-Star Games and was a six-time finalist for the Lady Byng Memorial Trophy for sportsmanship and gentlemanly conduct on the ice (Oates has described himself as the Susan Lucci for the Lady Byng.) The Markham Waxers retired his jersey number 10 in 1999. Oates was inducted into the Hockey Hall of Fame as part of its 2012 class.

Coaching career

Assistant coach
The Tampa Bay Lightning hired Oates as an assistant coach in the 2009–10 season, where he worked with the team's offence. Under his guidance, the team's power play finished ninth in the league and he was credited with playing a significant role in Steven Stamkos' offensive development. Oates then joined the New Jersey Devils in 2010, where he served an additional two years as an assistant coach, helping the team reach the 2012 Stanley Cup Finals, which they lost to the Los Angeles Kings in six games. New Jersey general manager Lou Lamoriello praised Oates' work with the team: "He did an outstanding job for us. I wish him well. He's very communicative, very intelligent, he explains things very well. He has the resume behind him as a player and having the success he had – all the credentials are there for having the kind of respect players have for him."

Washington Capitals
The same day Oates was elected to the Hockey Hall of Fame, June 26, 2012, he returned to Washington Capitals, where he was named the 16th head coach in franchise history, succeeding Dale Hunter, who had decided not to renew his contract. Oates' former teammates praised his appointment as head coach, calling him a "detail-oriented players' coach" with excellent communication skills. While the 2012–13 NHL lockout delayed Oates' debut with the Capitals, he acted as co-coach with Mark French for Washington's AHL affiliate, the Hershey Bears.

When the NHL resumed for the shortened 2012–13 season, Oates and the Capitals struggled initially and won only 2 of their first 11 games. However, the team improved throughout the season and went from last place in the Southeast Division to first; they won 15 of their final 19 games to win the division title. Oates' players praised his positive outlook and willingness to work closely with them as a primary reasons why the team was able to turn its season around. However, the Capitals were defeated in the first round of the 2013 Stanley Cup playoffs, losing to the New York Rangers in seven games.

The Capitals struggled throughout the 2013–14 season and faced increasing discontent from the fans as the team had failed to advance far into the playoffs in 16 years. The team finished with a 38–30–14 record, but finished ninth in the Eastern Conference and missed the playoffs. As a consequence, the Capitals opted to dismiss both Oates as head coach and the team's general manager, George McPhee.

New Jersey Devils
On December 27, 2014, Oates was hired by the New Jersey Devils to become what the team referred to as a "co-head coach" following the team's firing of head coach Peter DeBoer. Oates split coaching duties with former Devils captain Scott Stevens, with each coach responsible for a specific group of players; Oates was responsible for the forwards while Stevens was responsible for the defensemen. Oates and Stevens were assisted by Devils general manager Lou Lamoriello, who had previously served as the team's interim head coach. On June 1, 2015, John Hynes was named the new full-time head coach.

Personal life
Although Oates left RPI after three years to begin his professional hockey career, he continued his studies during the off-seasons. He earned a Bachelor of Science degree in management from the school in 1991. 

While a member of the Bruins, Oates also worked for a brief time with the investment firm Boston Capital Partners. 

Oates is a co-founder of sporting apparel retailer Old Time Hockey, a company that donates a portion of all sales to the NHL emergency assistance fund.

Oates operated a men's boutique on 69th and 3rd in New York City for a few years, which he discussed when profiled by Harry Rosen.

His parents are David and Loretta, and he has two sisters: Michelle and Laurel. Oates was once engaged to model and actress Darlene Vogel, however the couple cancelled their planned 1998 marriage at the last moment. He also has a house in Osterville, Massachusetts.

Career statistics

Regular season and playoffs

Coaching

Awards and honours

See also
 List of NHL statistical leaders

References
Career statistics:

External links
 

1962 births
Living people
Adirondack Red Wings players
Boston Bruins players
Canadian ice hockey centres
Detroit Red Wings players
Edmonton Oilers players
Hockey Hall of Fame inductees
Ice hockey people from Toronto
Mighty Ducks of Anaheim players
National Hockey League All-Stars
New Jersey Devils coaches
People from Weston, Toronto
Philadelphia Flyers players
Rensselaer Polytechnic Institute alumni
RPI Engineers men's ice hockey players
St. Louis Blues players
Tampa Bay Lightning coaches
Undrafted National Hockey League players
Washington Capitals coaches
Washington Capitals captains
Washington Capitals players
People from Osterville, Massachusetts
Sportspeople from Barnstable County, Massachusetts
Canadian ice hockey coaches
NCAA men's ice hockey national champions
AHCA Division I men's ice hockey All-Americans